The 2020–21 Scottish Women's Premier League was the 20th season of the SWPL, the highest division of women's football in Scotland since 2002. The league season was played in two divisions, SWPL 1 with eight teams and SWPL 2 with 10 teams. Glasgow City were the defending champions, having won the last completed championship in 2019. The league was known as the Scottish Building Society Scottish Women's Premier League for sponsorship reasons. 

The previous season, 2020, was interrupted by the coronavirus pandemic and was subsequently declared null and void. Following this cancellation, Scottish Women's Football reverted to the winter-season format last used in 2008–09. The new season started on 18 October 2020 and concluded on 4 July 2021. It had been agreed that there would be no relegation from SWPL 1, and that there would be 10 teams in the top division in 2021–22. The 2020–21 season was interrupted for more than three months by the pandemic; SWPL 1 played no games between January and March.

Glasgow City won the championship by three points from Celtic, the runners-up. This was Glasgow City's 14th national league title in succession, the most in Scottish senior football history, and five fewer than the world record in women's football at the time, 19, by SFK.

Aberdeen won the SWPL 2 title, and won promotion alongside the runners-up, Hamilton Academical. Partick Thistle were later added as a third promoted club, after Forfar Farmington withdrew from the SWPL.

Teams

SWPL 1

Source:

SWPL 2

Source:

SWPL 1

League table

Positions by round

Results

Matches 1 to 14

Matches 15 to 21

SWPL 2

League table

Positions by round

Results

Statistics

Scoring

SWPL 1

Source:

SWPL 2

Source:

Hat-tricks

SWPL 1

SWPL 2

References

External links
 Official website

Scot
Scottish Women's Premier League seasons
Premier League